Kayin can refer to: 
 Kayin State, an administrative division of Myanmar (Burma)
 Kayin or Karen people, a minority ethnic group in Myanmar
 Kayin, Iran, a village in Kerman Province, Iran
 alternative spelling for Cain
 Kayin Amoh, a character in the Battle Arena Toshinden fighting game series
 Kayin, alias of the creator of the indie video game I Wanna Be The Guy